Victor José Bisbal Melero (born 2 July 1980) is a Puerto Rican professional boxer. As an amateur, he won a gold medal at the 2002 Central American and Caribbean Games in the heavyweight division and bronze at the 2003 Pan American Games. He also participated at the 2004 Olympics in the super heavyweight division.

Personal life
Victor Bisbal began in the sport at the age of 15 years. Before beginning boxing, he competed in hurling and discus, winning four LAI championship rings in University competition and holding many Puerto Rican distance records. He graduated in 2005 with a bachelor's degree in Physical Education from Turabo University in Puerto Rico. Victor  got married on March 13, 2010 to Mariler Mejias, a volleyball player. Victor has three siblings, brothers Ricardo and Gerardo and sister Mayela. His brother Gerardo Bisbal is also a boxer and National Champ of Puerto Rico, bronze medallist in 2002 in 81 kg, 2006 in +91 kg and 2010 gold medallist Central American and Caribbean Games, having participated in 2003 in 91 kg and 2007 in +91 kg Pan American Games.

Bisbal worked with the Sports and Recreation Department and the Salinas municipal gym for years. However, he was ousted when Ricardo Rosselló won the 2016 elections. Afterwards, Bisbal joined his brother (who is a mechanic by profession, like their father) in operating a workshop at Salinas.

Amateur achievements

Record 60–11 Puerto Rican National Champ 1999–2004
Bisbal began boxing as an amateur at 18 years old; he had victories against Jason Estrada (USA) (2 times), David Cadieux (CAN) (2 times), Davin King (USA) (1-1), George Garcia (USA,MEX)(1-1)

He was defeated by Manuel Azar (ARG)(once), Pedro Carrion and Michel López Núñez (CUB)(once), Davin King, George Garcia and Calvin Brock (USA)(once), Andrey Derevtsov (RUS)(once), Bermane Stiverne (CAN), Sebastian Koeber (GER), Jaroslav Jakstov (LIT)(once)

He participated in 1999 Pan American Games Qualification Tournament for Central American - Salinas, Puerto Rico. These were his first amateur fights. Results were:

won against Benjamin Garcia (MEX) 11:10 quarterfinal

won against Leon Palmer (JAM) RSC 3 semifinal

won against Juan Romans (COS) 9:6 final

Participated in 1999 Pan American Games in Winnipeg, Canada with only 7 fights, results were: +91 kg

lost against Manuel Azar (ARG) 14:7 quarterfinal

Participated in 2000 Boxing Olympic Qualifications, results were:

lost against Calvin Brock (USA) RSCH 3

Participated in 2002 Central American and Caribbean Games, Cartagena, Colombia results were: 91 kg won gold medal

won against Cesar Uribe (MEX) KO 1, bodyshot, quarter final

won against Elibert Cova (VEN) walkover, semifinal

won against Kertson Manswell (TRI) RSCO 4, final

Participated 2002 World cup, Azerbaijan results were: +91 kg Participated with Mexican team because Puerto Rico did not participate.

Mexico vs Korea
 
won against Mouzafar Saipov (KOR) walkover

Mexico vs Russia

Lost against Andrey Derevtsov (RUS) 21:19
After this fight the spectators booed the decision.

2003 Pan American Games, Santo Domingo, Republica Dominicana results were: +91 kg won bronze medal
won against David Cadieux (CAN) 19:12 quarter-final
lost against Michel López Núñez (CUB) 17:13 semifinal
2004 Titan Games Atlanta, USA result were:
lost against Sebastian Koeber (GER) 25-18 
2004 Boxing Olympic Qualifications Tijuana, Mexico results were:
lost against Bermane Stiverne (CAN) points doubtful decision
after Bermane Stiverne lost against George Garcia (MEX)
2004 Boxing Olympic Qualifications Rio de Janeiro, Brasil results were:
won against Freeman Smith (BER) RSCO semifinal
won against George Garcia (MEX) 23-19 final
2004 Olympic Games Athens, Greece result were:
lost against Jaroslavas Jaksto (LTU) 26:17 preliminaries

Professional career

Bisbal signed with Top Rank for his professional debut in the year 2005, but after a defeat he continued his career without a promoter. He continued fighting and his manager was Evangelista Cotto, Bisbal posting a record of 13-1 11 knockouts. In 2009, a year since his fight number 15, Victor Bisbal began with a new manager Orlando Piñeiro,  who also manages Juan Manuel Lopez,  hoping that his career will reach many championship titles. Victor and Juan Manuel are very good  friends, Victor can always be seen in the ring before and after Juan Manuel's importants fights.

Professional boxing record

References

External links
Yahoo! Sports
 

1980 births
Living people
People from Salinas, Puerto Rico
Super-heavyweight boxers
Heavyweight boxers
Boxers at the 2003 Pan American Games
Boxers at the 2004 Summer Olympics
Olympic boxers of Puerto Rico
Puerto Rican male boxers
Pan American Games bronze medalists for Puerto Rico
Pan American Games medalists in boxing
Central American and Caribbean Games gold medalists for Puerto Rico
Competitors at the 2002 Central American and Caribbean Games
Central American and Caribbean Games medalists in boxing
Medalists at the 2003 Pan American Games